The molecular formula C17H24N2O3 (molar mass: 304.39 g/mol) may refer to:

 N-Methylcarfentanil
 Tilisolol

Molecular formulas